Series 2 of The Great Irish Bake Off, aired on TV3 and saw twelve home bakers take part in a bake-off to test every aspect of their baking skills as they battled to be crowned The Great Irish Bake Off's best amateur baker. Each week saw keen bakers put through two challenges in a particular discipline. The series aired from 21 May 2014 till 9 July 2014.

The Bakers

Results Summary

Colour key:

NOTE: No one was eliminated in episode 5 because Hazel became ill and didn't complete the technical challenge.

Episodes

Episode 1: Cake

Episode 2: Pastry

Episode 3: Biscuits

Episode 4: Continental

Episode 5: Bread

NOTE: Hazel did not finish the Technical Challenge as she became ill.

Episode 6: Classic Baking

NOTE: Hazel was eliminated after the Technical Challenge and did not participate in the Showstopper.

Episode 7: Desserts (Semi Final)

Episode 8: Final

The Great Irish Christmas Bake Off
Anna Nolan hosts a Christmas special in which regular judges Biddy White Lennon and Paul Kelly don the aprons and take contrasting approaches to baking for the festive season.
It aired on December 17, 2014.

References

2014 Irish television seasons
2